Moramanga District is a district in the Alaotra-Mangoro region in Madagascar. Its capital is Moramanga. 

It is situated between the capital Antananarivo and the east coast on the crossroad of RN 2 and RN 44. The name of Moranmanga originates from the slave trade. To differ them from other social classes, they were dressed in blue or manga. As they were among the cheapest (mora) in Africa, it became Moramanga.

People
Moramanga is also the capital city of the Bezanozano people (one of the eighteen Ethnic groups of Madagascar).

Communes
The district is further divided into 22 communes:

 Ambatovola
 Amboasary Gara
 Ambohidronono
 Ampasipotsy Gare
 Ampasipotsy Mandialaza
 Andaingo
 Andasibe
 Anosibe Ifody
 Antanandava
 Antaniditra
 Beforona
 Belavabary
 Beparasy
 Fierenana
 Lakato
 Mandialaza
 Moramanga
 Moramanga Suburbaine
 Morarano Gare
 Sabotsy Anjiro
 Vodiriana

Transports 
The national road RN 2 connects the city with Antananarivo (115 km) and Toamasina (254 km), the Route nationale 44 to Ambatondrazaka (157 km), Imerimandroso and Amboavory.

The city is at the TCE (Tananarive-Côte Est) and the south end of the MLA (Moramanga-Lac Alaotra) railways, so it's the only railway junction in Madagascar (except for the capital).

Economy
The nickel and cobalt mine of Ambatovy is situated near this town.

Wildlife
Protected areas near Moramanga are:

See also 
 Railway stations in Madagascar

References 

Districts of Alaotra-Mangoro